The California Zephyr is a passenger train operated by Amtrak between Chicago and the San Francisco Bay Area (at Emeryville), via Omaha, Denver, Salt Lake City, and Reno. At , it is Amtrak's longest daily route, and second-longest overall after the Texas Eagle's triweekly continuation from San Antonio to Los Angeles, with travel time between the termini taking approximately 51 hours. 
Amtrak claims the route as one of its most scenic, with views of the upper Colorado River valley in the Rocky Mountains, and the Sierra Nevada. The modern train is the second iteration of a train named California Zephyr; the original train was privately operated and ran on a different route through Nevada and California.

During fiscal year 2022, the California Zephyr carried 290,423 passengers, an increase of 57.3% over FY2021, but down from its pre-COVID-19 pandemic ridership of 410,844 in FY2019. The train had a total revenue of $51,950,998 in FY2016, the last year that route-specific revenue data was given.

History

Previous service

Prior to the 1971 creation of Amtrak, three competing trains ran between Chicago and the East Bay, with bus connections to San Francisco:
The California Zephyr was operated by the Chicago, Burlington and Quincy Railroad (CB&Q), Denver and Rio Grande Western Railroad (D&RGW), and Western Pacific Railroad (WP). It operated between Chicago and Oakland – along what is today called the Central Corridor and Feather River Route – via Omaha, Denver, Salt Lake City and Oroville.  Amid much fanfare and publicity, the California Zephyr was inaugurated on March 20, 1949. It was discontinued in March 1970 – the only one of the three trains not still operating when Amtrak took over service.
The City of San Francisco was operated by the Chicago, Milwaukee, St. Paul and Pacific Railroad (Milwaukee Road), Union Pacific Railroad (UP), and Southern Pacific Railroad (SP). It operated between Chicago and Oakland on the Overland Route via Omaha, Cheyenne, Ogden and Reno. 
The San Francisco Chief was operated by the Atchison, Topeka and Santa Fe Railway (AT&SF) via the more southerly Southern Transcon. It operated between Chicago and Richmond via Kansas City, Amarillo, and Bakersfield.

Railpax (renamed Amtrak in late April 1971) originally intended to revive the California Zephyr as part its original route network, using the Burlington Northern (ex-CB&Q) east of Denver, the DRG&W between Denver and Ogden, Utah, and the WP west of Ogden. The California Zephyr route would serve more populated areas (including Denver and Salt Lake City) than the Overland Route, would run through rural communities that lacked good highway access, and could attract passengers to its scenic routes.

However, since the WP had shed the last of its money-losing passenger service by terminating the California Zephyr, it was not eligible to participate in Amtrak's formation. On April 12, 1971, the WP refused to cooperate with Railpax, and the SP route between Ogden and Oakland was chosen instead.

On April 26, the D&RGW elected not to join Amtrak. The contract specified that Amtrak could later increase service, and D&RGW feared that would crowd its single-track mainline that competed with the UP's double-track route. The D&RGW chose to operate the Denver–Ogden Rio Grande Zephyr. Amtrak scrambled to piece together a Denver–Cheyenne–Ogden routing on the UP.

Amtrak era

Between the spring of 1971 and the summer of 1972, passengers traveling between Chicago and Oakland would have to travel on two different trains: the Denver Zephyr, which operated daily between Chicago and Denver, and the City of San Francisco, which operated three times a week, between Denver and the San Francisco Bay Area. Eventually, however, after several false starts, Amtrak consolidated the two trains into one, dubbed the San Francisco Zephyr, homage to both the California Zephyr and the San Francisco Chief, between Chicago and Oakland. The Rio Grande continued to operate the Rio Grande Zephyr between Denver and Ogden.

In 1983, the D&RGW elected to join Amtrak, citing increasing losses in passenger operations. Amtrak re-routed the San Francisco Zephyr over the D&RGW's Moffat Subdivision between Denver and Salt Lake City, its original preference from 1971. The change was scheduled for April 25, but a mudslide at Thistle, Utah, closed the line and delayed the change until July 16. With the change of route, Amtrak renamed the train as the California Zephyr. The modern California Zephyr uses mostly the same route as the original east of Winnemucca, Nevada. The train uses the route of the former City of San Francisco, along the Overland Route (First transcontinental railroad), between Elko, Nevada, and Sacramento. Across central Nevada, the two rail lines have been combined to use directional running. As such, the exact spot the train switches lines depends on the direction of travel.

For most of the 1980s and 1990s, the California Zephyr operated in tandem with the Seattle-bound Pioneer and Los Angeles-bound Desert Wind. Since 1980, the Pioneer and Desert Wind had exchanged through coaches with the San Francisco Zephyr at Ogden. The exchange point was moved to Salt Lake City when the latter train became the California Zephyr. This created a massive train of 16 Superliner cars running from Chicago to Utah, easily the longest train Amtrak had operated outside of the Auto Train. Amtrak required at least four EMD F40PH locomotives to pull this behemoth over the steep grades of the Moffat subdivision. To ease the load, Amtrak began splitting the Pioneer from the Zephyr and Desert Wind at Denver in 1991, while the Desert Wind continued splitting from the Zephyr at Salt Lake City. The Pioneer and Desert Wind were both discontinued in 1997.

The western terminus of the train was cut back to Emeryville station when Oakland Central station was closed on August 5, 1994. The California Zephyr was re-extended to Oakland with the opening of the Jack London Square station on May 12, 1995. However, this required a complicated reverse move along street running tracks to reach the wye at West Oakland. The train was cut back again to Emeryville on October 26, 1997.

Service between Reno and Denver was suspended for about a month in April 2020, as part of a round of service reduction in response to the coronavirus pandemic. Frequency was reduced to tri-weekly in October 2020, but was restored to daily service on May 24, 2021, after additional Amtrak funding was included in the American Rescue Plan Act of 2021. A resurgence of the virus caused by the Omicron variant and associated staffing and equipment shortages caused Amtrak to reduce the train's service to a five days a week Tuesday through Saturday schedule from January 19 to May 23, 2022. As of June 2022, daily service had resumed.

Equipment
The California Zephyr uses equipment typical for Amtrak's long-distance trains in the Western United States:
 2 GE Genesis/Siemens ALC-42 locomotives
 Viewliner II baggage car
 Superliner Transition Sleeper
 2-3 Superliner Sleepers
 Superliner Diner
 Superliner Sightseer Lounge
 2-3 Superliner Coaches

Route description

The west-bound train is Amtrak number 5 (number 6 eastbound). Upon leaving Chicago Union Station, the train travels along the Metra BNSF Railway Line, with an intermediate stop in Naperville, Illinois.

After passing through Aurora, Illinois, the train passes through the Illinois prairies, using the Burlington Rail Bridge to cross the Mississippi River in Burlington, Iowa. After running through southern Iowa, the Zephyr reaches the Missouri River between Council Bluffs, Iowa and Omaha, Nebraska. From Omaha, the train travels overnight through southern Nebraska and northeastern Colorado, making a morning arrival in Denver.

At Denver, the Zephyr switches over from BNSF to Union Pacific tracks. Westbound, the train is routed over the Central Corridor for the trip through the Tunnel District. The line crosses the Continental Divide via the 6.2 mile-long Moffat Tunnel under James Peak. Leaving the Moffat Tunnel, the tracks then follow the Colorado River from Winter Park Resort to Ruby Canyon, west of Grand Junction, which is also where the train enters Utah.

In Utah, the train follows the southern rim of the Book Cliffs to their end near Helper. The Zephyr crosses the Wasatch Mountains, cresting at Soldier Summit before descending into the Wasatch Front to arrive at Salt Lake City.

From Salt Lake City to Emeryville, the Zephyr route loosely follows Interstate 80, traveling along the south shore of the Great Salt Lake and across the Bonneville Salt Flats towards Nevada. After crossing into Nevada at Wendover, Utah/West Wendover, Nevada, the route passes the Toano Range, via Silver Zone Pass, across the Goshute Valley, tunnels under the Pequop Mountains and then skirts the northern edge of the Ruby Mountains.

The line first reaches the Humboldt River near Wells, which it loosely follows until the river's end in the Humboldt Sink near Lovelock. Here, the tracks cross the center of the Forty Mile Desert; on the other side of this desert valley is the Truckee River, which provides the line's path to Reno and up the Sierra Nevada in California.

In California, the tracks round Donner Lake, crest the Sierra Nevada at Donner Pass, and descend a high ridge between the American and Yuba Rivers, through Emigrant Gap. The line empties out into the California Central Valley, and then runs along the San Pablo Bay, with stops in Sacramento and Davis.  It crosses the Benicia Bridge and has stops in Martinez and Richmond.  The trip ends in Emeryville, a suburb of Oakland.  From Emeryville the free Emery Go Round shuttle connects passengers to the BART train or a Thruway Motorcoach provides connecting service to San Francisco's Embarcadero.

Rail line subdivisions
From east to west the current route of the Zephyr uses the following rail subdivisions:

BNSF Railway
 Chicago Subdivision Chicago Union Station to Aurora, Illinois
 Mendota Subdivision Aurora to Galesburg, Illinois
 Ottumwa Subdivision Galesburg to Creston, Iowa
 Creston Subdivision Creston to north-northwest of Plattsmouth, Nebraska
 Omaha Subdivision north-northwest of Plattsmouth to north-northeast of Ashland, Nebraska
 Creston Subdivision north-northeast of Ashland to Lincoln, Nebraska
 Hastings Subdivision Lincoln to McCook, Nebraska
 Akron Subdivision McCook to Brush, Colorado
 Brush Subdivision Brush to Denver

Union Pacific Central Corridor
 Greeley Subdivision to East Denver Belt Line in Denver just west of Broadway
 Moffat Tunnel Subdivision Denver (just west of Broadway) to south-southeast of Bond, Colorado between [MP-128] and [MP-129]
 Glenwood Springs Subdivision Bond to Grand Junction, Colorado
 Green River Subdivision Grand Junction to Helper, Utah
 Provo Subdivision Helper to Salt Lake City
 Lynndyl Subdivision Salt Lake City to Kennecott Smokestack [MP-767] west of Salt Lake City
 Shafter Subdivision [MP-911] Kennecott Smokestack to Elko, Nevada
 Elko Subdivision Elko to Weso (switching point east of Winnemucca, Nevada)
 Nevada Subdivision Weso to Sparks, Nevada
 Roseville Subdivision Sparks to Roseville, California
 Martinez Subdivision Roseville to Emeryville

Cities served
 Illinois: Chicago, Naperville, Princeton, Galesburg
 Iowa: Burlington, Mount Pleasant, Ottumwa, Osceola, Creston
 Nebraska: Omaha, Lincoln, Hastings, Holdrege, McCook
 Colorado: Fort Morgan, Denver, Fraser-Winter Park, Granby, Glenwood Springs, Grand Junction
 Utah: Green River, Helper, Provo, Salt Lake City
 Nevada: Elko, Winnemucca, Reno
 California: Truckee, Colfax, Roseville, Sacramento, Davis, Martinez, Richmond, Emeryville

Ridership

See also

 CB&Q Denver Zephyr
 Longest train journeys

References

Notes

External links

Amtrak routes
Passenger rail transportation in Illinois
Passenger rail transportation in Iowa
Passenger rail transportation in Nebraska
Passenger rail transportation in Colorado
Passenger rail transportation in Utah
Passenger rail transportation in Nevada
Passenger rail transportation in California
Night trains of the United States
Railway services introduced in 1983
1983 establishments in the United States
Long distance Amtrak routes